Yangyang International Airport  is a small international airport in northeastern South Korea. It is located in Yangyang County, Gangwon Province and was built to serve the nearby areas of Sokcho, Gangneung, and Pyeongchang. The airport replaced Gangneung and Sokcho airports.

In 2011, 5,748 passengers used the airport.

Air Koryo operated charters from Sondok Airport to Yangyang Airport during 2002–2006 for few months per year. Flights were halted indefinitely after relations soured between the two Koreas.

Yangyang International Airport handled its last flight on 1 November 2008, according to the Korea Airport Corporation, and there were calls for it to be sold off or closed. It reopened on 16 July 2010 when East Asia AirLine started flying to Busan.

On 4 August 2011, Taiwan's TransAsia Airways began flying to Yangyang International Airport (five times a week). TransAsia Airways stated that it will be a regular chartered service. However, on the 18th of February 2017, TransAsia Airways went into liquidation.

With Pyeongchang being voted as the host city for 2018 Winter Olympics, Yangyang International Airport hopes to see an increase in passengers. Korean Air scheduled additional charter flights from Yangyang to Europe and North America, including New York–JFK, Minneapolis–St. Paul, London–Gatwick, and Munich.

This includes a visa-free grace for the Philippines, Indonesia, and Vietnam so long as citizens land in Yangyang. VietJet Air is the only airline carrier that operates flights from South East Asia to Yangyang (charter flights from Hanoi to Yangyang).

Airlines and destinations

Statistics

Ground transportation

Bus
 Shuttle Bus : Yangyang Bus Terminal ↔ Yangyang International Airport

See also
 Transport in South Korea

References

External links
Yangyang International Airport (in English)
South Korea's abandoned airports

Buildings and structures in Gangwon Province, South Korea
Airports in South Korea
Yangyang County
Airports established in 2002
2002 establishments in South Korea